CTV News Channel may refer to:

 CTV News Channel (Canadian TV channel), a Canadian news channel formerly known as CTV Newsnet
CTV News Channel (Taiwanese TV channel), a news channel based in Taiwan